Elatobium abietinum, commonly known as the spruce aphid or green spruce aphid, is a species of aphid in the subfamily Aphidinae that feeds on spruce (Picea spp.), and occasionally fir (Abies spp.). It is native to Northern, Central and Eastern Europe and has spread to Western Europe, North America and elsewhere.

Description
The siphunculi (slender tubes on the fifth abdominal segment) are cylindrical, pale and slightly S-shaped, and are much longer than the cauda (tail-like protrusion).

Distribution and host range
Elatobium abietinum is native to Northern, Central and Eastern Europe where its original host is Picea abies. From this range it has spread to Western Europe where plantations of P. abies have been established, and expanded its host range to include Picea sitchensis and other Picea spp., and occasionally on fir (Abies spp.).  It has been introduced into Iceland, New Zealand, Tasmania, Chile and other regions where P. abies is grown in plantations. In North America it has become established and further extended its host range from P. sitchensis on the Pacific coast to Picea engelmannii and Picea pungens inland. Altogether it has been recorded feeding on 14 species of Picea and on 5 species of Abies.

Ecology
Elatobium abietinum has an unusual life cycle and feeds solely on coniferous trees. Wingless adult females often continue feeding and producing young parthenogenetically throughout the winter. In spring, winged aphids are produced and fly to other trees. Young nymphs enter diapause during the summer, recommencing development in the autumn. In Europe, males occur and there is a sexual phase, but in the other parts of the world, only females are known.

Invertebrate predators of this aphid in Wales include brown lacewings (Hemerobiidae), soldier beetles (Malthodes and Rhagonycha, Cantharidae), ladybirds (Coccinellidae) and hoverfly larvae (Syrphidae). Many small passerine birds feed on aphids, especially when they are feeding their young; they include warblers, sparrows, tits and chickadees, some finches, and woodpeckers.

Damage

Elatobium abietinum feeds by sucking sap from spruce needles, often causing defoliation of older needles and wilting of young growth. The presence of the aphids weakens the tree by decreasing growth rates and making it more susceptible to attack by other pests such as the spruce beetle (Dendroctonus rufipennis). Serious defoliation can kill the tree.

References

Aphidinae
Hemiptera of Europe
Insects described in 1849
Taxa named by Francis Walker (entomologist)